Jennifer Dawson, (24 January 1929 – 14 October 2000) was an English novelist. Her works explored the theme of mental illness and society's attitudes to those suffering from such conditions.

Biography
Born in London, she attended school in Camberwell and went on to read Modern History at St Anne's College, Oxford. During her time at Oxford she suffered a breakdown and spent several months in Warneford Hospital, Oxford.

Following the completion of her studies, she worked as a teacher at a convent in Laval in France and later at Oxford University Press where she made editorial contributions to a number of reference works. In addition to these roles, she also worked as social worker in a psychiatric hospital in Worcester and it was her experiences here and, as a patient of such an institution, that formed the basis for her debut novel The Ha-Ha. The novel, which explores schizophrenia, received considerable critical acclaim, being awarded the James Tait Black Memorial Prize, being adapted for the stage by Richard Eyre, and was later broadcast by the BBC on both radio and television.

She continued to explore similar themes throughout the 1960s and 1970s via novels such as The Cold Country, Strawberry Boy and A Field of Scarlet Poppies. In the 1980s two further novels The Upstairs People and Judasland were released by the Virago Press.

Awards and distinctions
James Tait Black Memorial Prize (1961)
Cheltenham Festival Award (1962)

Works

The Ha-Ha (1961)
Fowler's Snare (1963)
The Cold Country (1965)
The Queen of Trent (1972)
Strawberry Boy (1976)
Hospital Wedding (1978).
A Field of Scarlet Poppies (1979)
The Upstairs People (1988)
Judasland (1989)

1929 births
2000 deaths
English women novelists
Alumni of St Anne's College, Oxford
James Tait Black Memorial Prize recipients
20th-century English women writers
20th-century English novelists